Perry-Warsaw Airport  is a public use airport in Wyoming County, New York, United States. It is located three nautical miles (6 km) northwest of the Village of Perry and four nautical miles (7 km) east of the Village of Warsaw. The airport is owned by the Town of Perry and the Town of Warsaw. It is included in the National Plan of Integrated Airport Systems for 2011–2015, which categorized it as a general aviation facility.

Facilities and aircraft 
Perry-Warsaw Airport covers an area of 158 acres (64 ha) at an elevation of 1,558 feet (475 m) above mean sea level. It has two runways: 10/28 is 3,472 by 60 feet (1,058 x 18 m) with an asphalt surface and 4/22 is 1,830 by 60 feet (558 x 18 m) with a turf surface.

For the 12-month period ending November 15, 2010, the airport had 14,500 aircraft operations, an average of 39 per day: 97% general aviation and 3% military. At that time there were 22 aircraft based at this airport: 91% single-engine and 9% multi-engine.

References

External links 
 Perry-Warsaw Airport (01G) at NYSDOT Airport Directory
 Aerial image as of April 1995 from USGS The National Map
 

Airports in New York (state)
Transportation in Wyoming County, New York